The Iran Karate Federation (IKF) (Persian: فدراسیون کاراته جمهوری اسلامی ایران)  is the national body for Karate in Iran. This federation is the governing body of control and free styles of karate in Iran. It's the only association authorized to send Iranian Karatekas (Karate practitioners) to the Summer Olympics.

Iran is a world power in Karate.

List of styles covered

Control styles (Branch chief) 

 *WMMF (Abolhasan Kiya)
 IMA (Rashid Khodabakhsh)
 Kan Zen Ryu NGO (Mohammad Ariyankhou)
 Isshin Ryu (Mehrdad Nakhai)
 Isshin Ryu Okinawaie (Alireza Pournajmi)
 Isshin Ryu Shidokan (Seyed Saeed Hoseini)
 Persian Karate (Hosein Ebrahimi)
 Sato Ha Shito Ryu (Amir Mahdavi)
 ICKA Style (Masoud Rahnama Behmabri)
 Seishin Ryu (Seyed Mohammad Safivand)
 Shotokan FSK (Ali Assghar Pour Ebrahim)
 Shotokan JKS (Keykavous Saeedi)
 Shotokan JSKA (Mohammad Bahrami)
 Shotokan SKI (Manouchehr Aslanian)
 Shotokan WJKA (Hosein Dehghani)
 Shotokan WSKF (Ahmad Safi)
 Shotokan WUKA (Saeed Fard Nour Mohammadniya)
 Shotokan Advanced (Jamalodin Nekoufar)
 Shotokan Asai Ryu (Seyed Ali Baheri Oskouie)
 Shotokan  Iran (Gholamreza Dabaghian)
 Shotokan Tenshinkai (Alireza Monfared)
 Shotokan Ryu Bukai (Manouchehr Haji Mohammadian)
 Shotokai (Nasrin Farahi Moghadam)
 Shito-Ryu Seibukai (Alireza Mehrabi)
 Shito-Ryu JKS (Ali Shakeri)
 Shito-Ryu Itosukai (Alireza Samandar)
 Shito-Ryu Iran (Alireza Ehsani)
 Shito-Ryu Inoue-ha (Mohsen Ashouri)
 Shito-Ryu Budokai (Latid Nabizadeh)
 Shito-Ryu Seishinkai (Nasrollah Kakavand)
 Shito-Ryu Shobukan (Hasan Behzadi)
 Shito-Ryu Shukokai Karate (Arsalan Khezli)
 Shito-Ryu Shukokai Union (Mohammad Motaghian Nejad)
 Shito-Ryu  Shitokai (Hosein Shahrbaf)
 Shito-Ryu Kenshinkai (Seyed Esmaeil Khademian)
 Shito-Ryu Kube Osaka (Mohammad Ali Mardani)
 Shito-Ryu Koji Do (Goodarz Kamangir)
 Shito-Ryu Goshin Ryu (Yousof Ataie)
 Shito-Ryu Hayashi-ha (Seyed Abbas Ahmad Panahi)
 International Shito-Ryu (Fatemeh Mastoureh Bek)
 Shindai (Fatemeh Sadat Sahebkar)
 Fudokan Karate (Lovik Nazriyans)
 Funakoshi Shotokan (Sirous Shiripour)
 Traditional Karate (Afsaneh Bagheri)
 Kan Zen Ryu (Jamshid Salimi)
 Goju-Ryu IMA (Esfandiar Ziyal)
 Goju-Ryu Okinawaie IOGKF(Hadi EsmaeilNezhad)
 Goju-Ryu Okinawaie (Soleiman Mehdizadeh)
 Goju-Ryu Seiwakai (Ebrahim Topa Esfandiari)
 Goju-Ryu Gojukai (Aliakbar Mohammadi Bagha)
 Goju-Ryu  Watanabe-ha (Jamshid Ansari)
 Gojukai JKF / Kenbukai (Iraj Teymournejad)
 Wado-Ryu (Mohammad Behboudi)
 International Wado-Ryu (Mehrangiz Mosavari)
 Wadokan (Mohammad Bagher Aghamiri)

Free styles (Branch chief) 

 Sport Jiujitsu Karate (Nasrollah Kakavand)
 Ashihara (Hosein Negini)
 Enshin (Shahrokh Ghaledar)
 Oyama Karate (Seyed Hosein Moghadasi)
 Aiki Karate Do (Amirhosein Amiri)
 Budo Kyokushin (Abbas Negini)
 Budokai Do (Ali Khorami)
 Bushido Kyokushin Karate (Saeed Kordloo)
 Perfect Kyokushin (Seyed Hesam Makizadeh)
 Top Karate (Reza Kabiti Sadr)
 Tatakai Kyokushin (Faramarz Ghavam)
 Jukai Do (Aliakbar Dehnavi)
 Jiseen Karate Union (Amir Sharifi)
 Chanbara (Amir Mosadegh)
 Daido Iran (Majid Baghdarnia)
 Zendoki (Mahmoud Valimorad)
 Sun Shin Do (Mansour Haghighi)
 Sanshokai (Mohsen Davarzani)
 So Kyokushin (Vahid Bahroman)
 Seidokan (Hasan Shaafi)
 Shorin Kempo Kaikan (Seyed Mohammad Salehi)
 Shidokan (Majid Hanaie)
 Shin Tai Sabaki (Abdoreza Havizavi)
 Shindenkai (Hamid Soltani)
 Shin Do Kyokushin (Bahman Safi Hesari)
 Shin Zen Kyokushin (Arash Astadabadi)
 Shin Razm Zolfaghar (Gholam Abbas Khansari)
 Shinkyokushin (Ahmad Shaghaghi)
 Full Kyokushin Boxing (Amir Houshang Hajimoradi)
 Kenshinkai (Saber Shaghaghi)
 KenpoKaikan (Gholamreza Katebi)
 Contact Karate (Asgar Azadian)
 Ki Aun Budo (Mohammad Firouzfar)
 Kyokushin IKU (Behrouz Alizade Sani)
 Kyokushin KWF (Mohammad Mansourifard)
 Kyokushin UFK (Alireza Ahmadi)
 Kyokushin WKB (Vaoud Mojarrad Shahrivar)
 Kyokushin WKBF (Mohammad Sarkouhaki)
 Kyokushin WKO (Jamshid Parsimehr)
 Kyokushin WSKU (Morteza Shahri)
 Kyokushin Europe (Manouchehr Vahidi)
 Kyokushin Oyama (Ali Salman Ziyaie)
 Kyokushin Ichigeki (Seyed Davoud Mohammadi)
 Kyokushin Iran (Seyed Morteza Khoshi)
 Kyokushin Byakuren (Ahmad Shaghaghi)
 Kyokushin Tezuka (Mohammadreza Azough)
 KyokushinRyo Iran (Afshin Torkpour
 Kyokushin Sabaki (Farhad Sohrabi)
 Kyokushin Sakamoto (Fereydoun Firouzi)
 Traditional Kyokushin (Ahmad Pourmohseni)
 Kyokushin Shindenkai Karate (Mohammadreza Khoram)
 Kyokushin Karate Okinawaei (Ahmad Alirezaie)
 Kyokushin Karate Seibukai (Jafar Sahavan)
 Kyokushinkan (Davoud Daneshvar)
 Kyokushin Nakamura Union (Abdonabi Aghili Asl)
 Kyokushin Kenbukai (Mohammad Abdi)
 Kyokushin Matsushima (Mohsen Ashouri)
 Kyokushin Matsui (Masoud Homayounpour)
 Kyokushin Nakamura (Ali Asgari)
 Kyokushin Yashoda (Hojat Abdi)
 Kyokushin Union (Hosein Afrasiabi)
 Honkyokushin (Mohammad Savadkouhi)
 Ryo Yuge (Ali jafarkhani)

References

Karate in Iran
Karate organizations
Karate

Hon Kyokushin